Muris Mešanović (born 6 July 1990) is a Bosnian footballer who currently plays for Ekstraklasa club Bruk-Bet Termalica Nieciecza. He has represented his country at under-21 level.

Career
Mešanović played on loan for Jihlava during the 2009–10 Czech 2. Liga, finishing among the league's top scorers.

Mešanović missed the first half of the 2010–11 season due to an injury sustained in May 2010, but returned to Jihlava, again on loan, after the winter break.

FK Mladá Boleslav
In February 2019, he signed a three-year contract with Mladá Boleslav.

References

External links

1990 births
Living people
Bosnia and Herzegovina footballers
Bosnia and Herzegovina expatriate footballers
FK Jablonec players
FC Vysočina Jihlava players
FC DAC 1904 Dunajská Streda players
FK Mladá Boleslav players
SK Slavia Prague players
Kayserispor footballers
Denizlispor footballers
Bruk-Bet Termalica Nieciecza players
Czech First League players
Czech National Football League players
Slovak Super Liga players
Süper Lig players
Ekstraklasa players
Footballers from Sarajevo
Association football forwards
Bosnia and Herzegovina under-21 international footballers
Expatriate footballers in the Czech Republic
Bosnia and Herzegovina expatriate sportspeople in the Czech Republic
Expatriate footballers in Slovakia
Bosnia and Herzegovina expatriate sportspeople in Slovakia
Expatriate footballers in Turkey
Bosnia and Herzegovina expatriate sportspeople in Turkey
Expatriate footballers in Poland
Bosnia and Herzegovina expatriate sportspeople in Poland